Salemann is a surname. Notable people with the surname include:

 Carl Salemann (1850–1916), Russian Iranologist
  (1859–1919), Russian sculptor

Russian-language surnames